is a Shinto shrine in Takashima in Shiga Prefecture, Japan. The shrine is dedicated to Sarutahiko Okami. It is the head shrine of the Shirahige Shrines around the country. The shrine's annual festivals are on May 3 and September 5-6.

See also
Modern system of ranked Shinto Shrines

References

External links
Official website

Shinto shrines in Shiga Prefecture
Important Cultural Properties of Japan